The Jefferson City Correctional Center (JCCC) is a maximum security prison in Jefferson City, Missouri operated by the Missouri Department of Corrections. It houses up to 1996 inmates, with a staff of 660. It is located at Jefferson City Correctional Center (C-5), Institution, 8200 No More Victims Road Jefferson City, MO 65101.

The current JCCC was opened on September 15, 2004, replacing the Missouri State Penitentiary, also located in Jefferson City, an aging facility first opened in 1836. It is near the Algoa Correctional Center.

Notable inmates
Bobby Bostic, sentenced to 241 years for armed robbery and a carjacking committed when he was 16-years-old in 1995.

References

External links

Official website (Archive)

Buildings and structures in Jefferson City, Missouri
Prisons in Missouri
Government buildings completed in 2004
2004 establishments in Missouri